Hypophytala benitensis, the Holland's flash, is a butterfly in the family Lycaenidae. It is found in Ivory Coast, Ghana, Togo, Nigeria, Cameroon, Gabon, the Republic of the Congo, the Central African Republic and Tanzania. The habitat consists of forests.

Subspecies
Hypophytala benitensis benitensis (Ivory Coast, Ghana, Togo, Nigeria: south and the Cross River loop, Cameroon, Gabon, Congo, Central African Republic)
Hypophytala benitensis minziro Libert & Collins, 1999 (Minziro forest, north-western Tanzania)

References

Butterflies described in 1890
Poritiinae
Butterflies of Africa